UBK is acronym that may be related to:

 Berezin UB#Development
 Ukraine without Kuchma, the 2001 Ukrainian protests against President Leonid Kuchma